The Cuts Indonesia is an Indonesian reality hairstyling competition television series broadcast on Trans7 since 15 January 2017 and aired every Sunday at 8:30 PM. The judges are Henoch Sitompul, Indonesian actor Alex Abbad, Malaysian fashion icon Wak Doyok, and Claudia Adinda. The show is presented by Jevier Justin and Fitri Tropica.

References

2017 Indonesian television series debuts
Indonesian reality television series
2017 Indonesian television series endings